The Helix, formally The Helix Centre for the Performing Arts, is a multi-purpose venue located on the Dublin City University main campus in Glasnevin, Dublin. Officially opened by then President of Ireland, Mary McAleese, on 5 March 1996, the Helix contains a concert hall, theatre, studio theatre, exhibition space, artists-in-residence studios, and a green room and other support spaces, along with an in-site café.

History

Originally conceived as an aula maxima for the university, and also as the "North Dublin (Performing) Arts Centre," the Helix was built at a cost of €56.5 million between 1996 and mid-1998.

Design and features
The Helix was designed by the late Polish-born Dublin-based architect Andrzei Wejchert of A&D Wejchert & Partners Architects. It is a three-level building with elevations of contrasting glass and granite, and with an open void through which light spills from the roof. The 11,650 square metres of the building are built around a wide foyer with inclined columns and a helix-shaped stairway - the building was named for the helical structure that dominates the entrance.

The performance spaces include the main concert hall, "The O'Mahony Hall," main Helix theatre, "The Space" - a studio theatre, exhibition space, artists-in-residence studios, and a green room, while ancillary spaces include a café, box office, small shop, toilets and other amenities.

Performances and events 
The Helix has been host to world-class performances ranging from the Russian State Philharmonic Orchestra, The St Petersburg Ballet, international theatre and world singers through to popular West End shows. Opera singers performing have included Dame Kiri Te Kanawa, Lesley Garrett and Bryn Terfel. Rock musicians Van Morrison and Lou Reed have also played the venue. Irish groups such as Celtic Thunder have also performed there.

Covid-19
Because of the COVID-19 pandemic it is being used as a vaccination centre since February 2021. The centre is scheduled to be operating 8am-8pm seven days a week. The capacity of the car park was a factor in choosing the building. The vaccination centre is the work of collaboration between general practitioners, practice nurses, medical students, Order of Malta Ambulance Corps, Order of Malta Ambulance Corps, Department of Health, Dublin City University and Dublin Airport.

TV programmes
Many TV programmes have been broadcast from or recorded in The Helix.

Awards
 Irish Concrete Society Award – Building Category
 Irish Joinery Award – Joinery of the Mahony Hall – 1st Prize
 Plan Opus Building Awards Winner (2003)
 Shortlisted for the Best Purpose-built Venue (2014)

References

External links
 

Buildings and structures completed in 2002
Dublin City University
Glasnevin
Concert halls in the Republic of Ireland
Theatres in Dublin (city)
2002 establishments in Ireland
Music venues in Dublin (city)
21st-century architecture in the Republic of Ireland